Douglas John Cardew Robinson (14 August 1917 – 28 December 1992) was a British comic, whose career was rooted in the music hall and Gang Shows.

Early life and career 
Born in Goodmayes, Essex, Robinson was educated at Harrow County School for Boys. He enjoyed acting in school productions and loved the books of Frank Richards, featuring Billy Bunter of Greyfriars and the weekly magazine The Gem with the adventures of Ralph Reckness Cardew of St Jim's. In the early 1930s, while at Harrow County School, he wrote for the school magazine, the 'Gaytonian'.

On leaving school, he took a job with a local newspaper, but it folded and he then joined Joe Boganny's touring Crazy College Boys, which opened at the Lyric Theatre, Hammersmith, London. However, Robinson knew that he required a more traditional training and went into repertory theatre, where one of his roles was as the monster in an adaptation of Frankenstein. It was while serving in the RAF during the Second World War that he created his 'Cardew the Cad of the School' character. Promoted to flight-sergeant and put in charge of the show, Robinson toured France, Belgium and the Netherlands.

After the war, he appeared with the commercial production of the Gang Show in variety theatres. He began in variety and also played the character on radio and stage and later in a film, Fun at St. Fanny's. 'Cardew the Cad' became a cartoon strip in Radio Fun, a children's comic of the period.

Television, films and theatre 
Robinson had appeared in films as early as 1938, starting in a short in the series Ghost Tales Retold and following it ten years later with A Piece of Cake starring Cyril Fletcher. He successfully made the transition from Variety and radio into TV and films. In the latter, he nearly always played small but memorable cameo parts, thus an early theatrical review mentioned "Mr Cardew Robinson, who seems to specialise in grotesques". Unusually, in the 1956 film Fun at St Fanny's he had one of the main roles playing himself and received second to top billing.

One of his last appearances on television, in an episode of Last of the Summer Wine, in which he played a hen-pecked husband, led astray by Compo and Clegg, showed him to be a fine exponent of physical comedy into his 70s. He also appeared in an episode of Hancock's Half Hour. When Hancock was holding a reunion of his old Army friends, Cardew Robinson was the only one who appeared not to have become staid and boring – but when he took off his scarf, it was seen that he had become a vicar.

In the production of Camelot in London in 1964, Robinson played King Pellenore. The show apparently ran for 650 performances, although it was not well received by the critics. Also that year, Robinson's TV work included the series 'Fire Crackers', featuring the day-to-day challenges and mishaps of the Cropper's End Fire Brigade.

Cardew Robinson was best known in Britain for appearances on TV and in radio shows like You've Got to be Joking which he created, as well as Does the Team Think?. He only acted in one Carry On film, Carry On Up the Khyber; he played a fakir drawing the memorable line from Bernard Bresslaw, whose character, Bungdit Din, tells him "Fakir...off!".

Obituary 
Robinson died of ischemic colitis, in London on 27 December 1992, at the age of 75. His obituary in The Times, described him as "a quiet studious man, whose private face belied his public appearance". A letter to the paper from a later headmaster of his old school, talked about his "generous spirit". He had divorced before he died, but had two daughters, Leanne and Lindy.

Selected filmography 

 A Piece of Cake (1948) – Honest Joe (uncredited)
 Calling All Cars (1954) – Reggie Ramsbottom
 Fun at St. Fanny's (1955) – Cardew the Cad
 Happy Is the Bride (1958) – George the Verger
 The Navy Lark (1959) – Lt. Binns
 I'm All Right Jack (1959) – Shop Steward
 Let's Get Married (1960) – Salesman
 Light Up the Sky! (1960) – Compere
 A French Mistress (1960) – Ambulance Attendant
 Three on a Spree (1961) – Micki
 Hair of the Dog (1962) – Doctor
 Crooks Anonymous (1962) – Wiseman – Helicopter Brother
 Waltz of the Toreadors (1962) – Midgley the Undertaker
 The Wrong Arm of the Law (1963) – Postman (uncredited)
 Heavens Above! (1963) – Tramp
 Ladies Who Do (1963) – Police Driver
 A Stitch in Time (1963) – Pinching Patient (uncredited)
 Father Came Too! (1963) – Fire Officer
 Hide and Seek (1964) – Constable
 Alfie (1966) – Gay Man in Pub (uncredited)
 I Was Happy Here (1966) - Gravedigger
 Three Bites of the Apple (1967) – Bernhard Hagstrom
 Smashing Time (1967) – Custard Pie Vicar
 The Avengers (1967) TV Series, Episode "The £50,000 Breakfast" – pet cemetery vicar
 Carry On Up the Khyber (1968) – The Fakir
 Where's Jack? (1969) – Lord Mayor
 The Nine Ages of Nakedness (1969) – The Magistrate (segment "The Theatre")
 The Thirteen Chairs (1969) – Car Park Attendant
 The Magnificent Seven Deadly Sins (1971) – Guest Appearance (segment "Sloth")
 Come Play With Me (1977) – McIvar
 What's Up Nurse! (1978) – Ticket Inspector
 Pirates (1986) – Lawyer
 Shirley Valentine (1989) – Londoner

References

External links 

 
 Obituary in The Independent, 29 December 1992
 

1917 births
1992 deaths
English male comedians
People educated at Harrow High School
English male film actors
English male television actors
20th-century English male actors
20th-century English comedians
Royal Air Force personnel of World War II
Royal Air Force airmen
Military personnel from Essex